Zvi Schreiber (  (born 9 June 1969) is a British-Israeli serial entrepreneur, executive, and author. He founded high-tech startups like G.ho.st, which at the time was considered the only high-tech startup with a joint Palestinian–Israeli team.  In 2011 Schreiber was CEO of Lightech which he sold to GE Lighting.

Biography
Zvi Schreiber has a BA in Mathematics from the University of Cambridge, an MSc in Theoretical Physics (Quantum Fields) from Imperial College London, and a PhD in Computer Science from Imperial College London. He is the brother of Daniel Schreiber, CEO and co-founder of Lemonade. Schreiber also studied at Yeshivat Har Etzion.

Business career
Schreiber is the CEO of startup logistics technology company Freightos, a digital booking platform for international air and ocean freight that he describes as the "equivalent of Expedia/Orbitz/Kayak for the shipment of goods rather than people". Under Schreiber's leadership Freightos also acquired WebCargo which is a booking platform for freight forwarders, airlines and ocean liners, and launched the daily Freightos Baltic Index (FBX) of containerized shipping prices.

In 2011 Schreiber was CEO of Lightech Electronic Industries Ltd, based in Israel, where he had served as a director since 1996. His father David Schreiber, an experienced businessman and investor, chaired the board. Lightech was acquired by GE Lighting at the end of 2011, during Schreiber's tenure.

Schreiber founded the following companies:
 IsraTec Limited
 Tradeum Inc, acquired by VerticalNet
 Unicorn Inc, acquired by IBM
 Ghost Inc  (which traded as G.ho.st and has now closed operations).
 Freightos Limited

Schreiber has been invited to speak at software industry events and economic conferences. 

He is a co-inventor of several patents and patent applications. He is the author of a paper presenting a Distributed Ledger Technology (Blockchain) algorithm named k-root-n.

Published works 
 Money, Going out of style, a book which explains the fundamentals of money and explores modern issues of inequality and money printing without inflation.
 Bad Hair Day, a small picture book with his own photography
 Fizz: Nothing is as it seems, which tells the story of the history of physics through a novel about a troubled young girl who time travels to meet Galileo, Newton, Einstein, and others, in the genre of Sophie's World. It earned a five star Clarion rating.

References

External links
 
 Fizz official web site 
 Freightos' web site

1969 births
Living people
British businesspeople
Israeli businesspeople
Yeshivat Har Etzion